Mariamne is a 1723 tragedy play by the British writer Elijah Fenton. It is based on the biblical Mariamne, wife of Herod the Great of Judea. The following year Voltaire produced a French play of the same title.

Staged at the Lincoln's Inn Fields Theatre the original cast included Anna Maria Seymour as Mariamne, Anthony Boheme as Herod, Jane Egleton as Salome, Thomas Walker as Pheroras, Jane Rogers as Arsinoe, James Quin as Sohemus, Lacy Ryan as Flaminius and John Leigh as the High Priest.

References

Bibliography
 Burling, William J. A Checklist of New Plays and Entertainments on the London Stage, 1700-1737. Fairleigh Dickinson Univ Press, 1992.

1723 plays
British plays
West End plays
Tragedy plays
Plays set in the 1st century
Plays based on actual events
Cultural depictions of Herod the Great